Qaleh Nowruz (also Romanized as Qal‘eh Nowrūz) is a village in Korzan Rud Rural District, in the Central District of Tuyserkan County, Hamadan Province, Iran. At the 2006 census, its population was 311, in 85 families.

References 

Populated places in Tuyserkan County